Sceloporus lunae, Luna's spiny lizard, is a species of lizard in the family Phrynosomatidae. It is found in  Guatemala.

References

Sceloporus
Endemic fauna of Guatemala
Reptiles of Guatemala
Reptiles described in 1873
Taxa named by Marie Firmin Bocourt